The 1964 Wyoming Cowboys football team was an American football team that represented the University of Wyoming as a member of the Western Athletic Conference (WAC) during the 1964 NCAA University Division football season.  In their third season under head coach Lloyd Eaton, the Cowboys compiled a 6–2–2 record (2–2 in WAC, fourth), and outscored opponents by a total of 181 to 117. Dick Barry, Jeff Hartman, and Bill Levine were the team captains.

Schedule

References

External links
 Game program: Wyoming at Washington State – September 26, 1964

Wyoming
Wyoming Cowboys football seasons
Wyoming Cowboys football